Berezovka is a rural locality (a village) in Volzhsky Utyos Rural Settlement of Shigonsky District of Samara Oblast, Russia. Population:

References

Rural localities in Samara Oblast